is a Prefectural Natural Park in Iwate Prefecture, Japan. Established in 1966, the park spans the municipalities of Ōfunato, Kamaishi and Sumita.

See also
 National Parks of Japan

References

External links
  Map of Goyōzan Prefectural Natural Park

Parks and gardens in Iwate Prefecture
Protected areas established in 1966
1966 establishments in Japan